Richard A. Cerosky (February 13, 1927 – November 30, 2016) was an American politician who served in the New York State Assembly from 1965 to 1970.

He died on November 30, 2016, in Glens Falls, New York at age 89.

References

1927 births
2016 deaths
Republican Party members of the New York State Assembly